Juan Antonio de Frías y Escalante (1633 in Cordoba–1669 in Madrid) was a Spanish Baroque Golden Age painter.

He was born in Córdoba, studied under Francisco Ricci in Madrid, and developed a career in the Spanish Court despite his early death. He was an admirer of Venetian paintings by Tintoretto and Veronese. His last paintings are in the rococo style. He is known for his religious paintings, e.g. Roman Catholic Marian art depicting the Immaculate Conception.

References
Pérez Sánchez, Alfonso E. (1992). Baroque Paintings in Spain 1600-1750, Madrid : Ediciones Cátedra. .
Palomino, Antonio (1988). El museo pictórico y escala óptica III. El parnaso español pintoresco laureado, p. 333. Madrid : Aguilar S.A. de Ediciones. .
Requena Bravo de Laguna, José Luis, Nuevas aportaciones a la Juno de Alonso Cano: su procedencia y reinterpretación en la obra de Juan Antonio de Frías y Escalante, in Espacio, Tiempo y Forma, Series VII, vol. 18–19, 2005–2006, p. 77-83

External links

Biography at the Museo del Prado. 
Saint Joseph and the Infant Christ at the Hermitage.
Scholarly articles about Juan Antonio de Frías y Escalante. Attributed to both in web and PDF @ the Spanish Old Masters Gallery

1633 births
1669 deaths